Native Son is a 1941 Broadway drama written by Paul Green and Richard Wright based on Wright's novel Native Son. It was produced by Orson Welles and John Houseman with Bern Bernard as associate producer and directed by Welles with scenic design by John Morcom. It ran for 114 performances from March 24, 1941 to June 28, 1941 at the St. James Theatre.

This is the last time Welles and Houseman, co-founders of the Mercury Theatre, ever worked together.

Synopsis

Differences in plot 
Richard Wright and Paul Green edited Native Son'''s plot to fit the time constraints of a play more easily. Certain parts are edited or cut completely. In the novel, the daughter of Bigger Thomas's employers, Mary, has a communist boyfriend, Jan, whom Bigger tries to blame for Mary's murder. Bigger even tries to collect ransom for Mary's supposedly missing body. He also becomes the Daltons' chauffeur only after a failed robbery attempt of a white man's store. In the drama, these details are erased. It becomes simpler and more objective—Bigger becomes the Daltons' chauffeur because of a social worker. He kills Mary by accident, as in the book, but is shortly found after a manhunt through Chicago.

Green's original script called for Bigger to become devoutly religious at the end of the story, a theme not present in the novel; Wright helped Houseman remove this aspect and did not inform Green. Houseman believed that the religion twist went against Wright's viewpoint.

Production
Cast

 Canada Lee as Bigger Thomas
 Frances Bavier as	Peggy
 Everett Sloane as	Britten
 Philip Bourneuf as Buckley, District Attorney
 Ray Collins as Paul Max, defense attorney 
 John Berry as a reporter
 Helen Martin as Vera Thomas
 Evelyn Ellis as Hannah Thomas
 Joseph Pevney as Jan Erlone
 Erskine Sanford as Mr. Dalton
 C. M. "Bootsie" Davis as Earnie Jones
 Eileen Burns as Miss Emmett
 Anne Burr as Mary Dalton
 Nell Harrison as Mrs. Dalton
 Jacqueline Ghant Andre as a neighbor
 William Malone as Judge
 Rena Mitchell as Clara
 J. Flashe Riley as Jack
 Wardell Saunders as Gus Mitchell
 Rodester Timmons as G. H. Rankin
 Lloyd Warren as Buddy Thomas

Newspaper Men
 Don Roberts
 Stephen Roberts
 Paul Stewart
 George Zorn

Versions
The 1941 adaptation of the novel was revised in 1978 for the dedication of the Paul Green Theatre at the University of North Carolina at Chapel Hill. The script by Green and Wright was adapted again in 2006 by Cheryl West for Seattle's Initman Theatre, however, she withdrew the right to perform it prior to the play's opening. An adaptation by director Kent Gash was presented in its stead. A later adaptation, not based on the Green-Wright script, was written by Nambi E. Kelley in 2016 for a joint production from American Blues Theater and Court Theatre in Chicago.

 Critical reception 
Critics greeted Native Son's 1941 premiere warmly, especially praising Canada Lee's turn as Bigger Thomas. Said Rosamond Gilder in Theatre and Arts, May 1941: " Much of what is important in the novel but is lost in the play -the profound subjective exposure of the Negro's unconscious motivations- is restored by the actor's performance. Bigger's smouldering resentment against the world as he has always known it; his unreflecting violence breaking out even more easily against the things he loves -his mother, his friends, his girl- than against the things he hates; his profound frustration stemming from the denial of his right to live;". The New York Times said it was "powerful" and "exciting". Time called it "the strongest play of the season".

Aljean Harmetz wrote in The New York Times stated "the play got excellent reviews and did good business."

References

 External links 

 
  (archive)
 "Native Son: Best-Selling Novel is Turned into Tense Drama Strikingly Staged by Orson Welles" Life, April 7, 1941, pp. 94–96
 Major Dramatic Works: Native Son, 1940–1980 in the Paul Green Papers, #3693, Southern Historical Collection, The Wilson Library, University of North Carolina at Chapel Hill
 Actual Stage Timing, Court Room Scene from the Mercury Theatre Production of Native Son (1941). Orson Welles on the Air, 1938–1946'', Indiana University Bloomington. Orson Welles reads the role of Paul Max.

1941 plays
Broadway plays
Plays set in Illinois
Chicago in fiction
Plays by Paul Green
Orson Welles
Plays based on novels
Works by Richard Wright (author)
Plays about race and ethnicity